Cooroy is a rural town and locality in the Shire of Noosa, Queensland, Australia. In the  the locality of Cooroy had a population of 3,791 people.

Geography 
The Bruce Highway runs through the locality from south-east to north-west, bypassing the town. The Cooroy Noosa Road (State Route 6) runs north through the town from the Bruce Highway, then turns east.

History
Cooroy's name came from Mount Cooroy, which was originally called Coorooey, from an Aboriginal word for possum, kurui.

The area was explored by timber-cutters as early as 1863. Cooroy's main industry developed from timber, having two operating sawmills, into dairying and fruit growing. In 1915, a butter factory opened.

Cooroy railway station was opened in 1891 and in the same year a post office opened. A town survey was conducted in 1907.

Cooroy State School opened in 1909. Cooroy West State School opened in 1911 but closed in 1962.

In February 1910, it was proposed to build a Methodist Church at Cooroy. In July 1911 a call for tenders to erect the church was issued. The stump-capping ceremony was held on Thursday 7 September 1911. The church was officially opened on Wednesday 31 January 1912 by Harry Walker, followed by a social evening to celebrate the following day. On 19 February 1949 the current church building opened and the 1911 church building became the church hall, having been relocated to the back of the site. With the amalgamation of the Methodist Church into the Uniting Church in Australia in 1977, it became the Cooroy Uniting Church.

The Anglican Church of the Holy Nativity was dedicated on 21 March 1914 by Archdeacon Henry Le Fanu. That church was destroyed by a cyclone on 19 February 1954. On Sunday 7 November 1954 Archbishop Reginald Halse dedicated the new church.

On 23 January 1961, a secondary department was added to Cooroy State School until the Cooroy State High School was opened as a separate school on 23 January 1963. In 1967 it became Noosa District State High School. In 2007, it was Cooroora Secondary College at Pomona which was merged into Noosa District State High School, with the Pomona campus being used for the younger students and Cooroy campus being used for the older students.

In 1991, Noosa Shire Council purchased former Butter Factory buildings for use as a community centre which is now run by Cooroy Future Group as an arts centre.

The town was bisected by the Bruce Highway until a bypass was built in 1994.

Noosa Christian College opened on 28 January 2003 as a primary school with 37 students. In 2007 it expanded to offer secondary classes.

Between 2008 and 2013, Cooroy was part of the Sunshine Coast Region.

The Cooroy Library opened in 2010.

The Hinterland Adventure Playground was officially opened in Cooroy on 6 May 2022 by Noosa Shire's mayor Clare Stewart.

Heritage listings
Cooroy has a number of heritage-listed sites, including:
 Lower Mill Road: Cooroy Lower Mill Site Kiln
 33 Maple Street: Cooroy Post Office
 14 Myall Street: Cooroy railway station

Education
Cooroy State School is a government primary (Prep-6) school for boys and girls at 59 Elm Street.  In 2016, the school had an enrolment of 545 students with 40 teachers (34 full-time equivalent) and 24 non-teaching staff (15 full-time equivalent). In 2018, the school had an enrolment of 492 students with 39 teachers (32 full-time equivalent) and 30 non-teaching staff (19 full-time equivalent).

Noosa District State High School is a government secondary (7-12) school for boys and girls at Tulip Street.  In 2016, the school had a total enrolment of 1,335 students with 111 teachers (106 full-time equivalent) and 48 non-teaching staff (40 full-time equivalent). In 2018, the school had an enrolment of 1274 students with 109 teachers (104 full-time equivalent) and 62 non-teaching staff (45 full-time equivalent).

Noosa Christian College is a private primary and secondary (Prep-12) school for boys and girls at 20 Cooroy Belli Creek Road. It is operated by Adventist Schools Australia. In 2016, the school had an enrolment of 243 students with 21 teachers (19.1 full-time equivalent) and 14 non-teaching staff. In 2018, the school had an enrolment of 252 students with 22 teachers (20 full-time equivalent) and 11 non-teaching staff (7 full-time equivalent).

Cooroy Community Kindergarten (CCK) is at 13-15 Maple Street.

Amenities 

Cooroy has a hotel, a police station, a golf club, a bowls club, the RSL club and sub branch. An overnight RV park has opened at Johnson Park.

The Shire of Noosa operates a library at 9 Maple Street.

Cooroy Pomona Uniting Church is at 51 Maple Street.

The Cooroy branch of the Queensland Country Women's Association meets at the Cooroy Memorial Hall & School of Arts at 23 Maple Street.

Cooroy-Pomona RSL Sub-Branch is at 25 Maple Street.

The Hinterland Adventure Playground is in Marara Street.

Other groups include:
Cooroy Memorial Hall Association Inc. (based in Cooroy)
Cooroy Future Group Inc (based in Cooroy)
Cooroy Area Residents Association Inc.
Cooroy Chamber of Commerce
Rotary Club of Cooroy
Cooroy Scout Group

Transport
Cooroy railway station is serviced by two daily Queensland Rail City network services in each direction and is also utilized by Queensland Rail Travel's long-distance Traveltrain services; the Spirit of Queensland between Brisbane to Cairns, the Spirit of the Outback between Brisbane to Longreach and the Bundaberg and Rockhampton Tilt Trains.

Notable residents
 Major General John Cantwell, AO, DSC (Retd.) – former Deputy Chief of Army
 Marayke Jonkers – Bronze and Silver medal Paralympic swimmer

See also

References

External links
 
 
 
 Cooroy Website
 Cooroy Area Residents Association Inc
 Cooroy Rotary Club
 Christmas in Cooroy
 Cooroy Fusion Festival
 Cooroy Chamber of Commerce Inc

 
Suburbs of Noosa Shire, Queensland
Populated places established in 1885
Towns in Queensland
Localities in Queensland